Kaleidoscope is a 2015 extended play (EP) by Courtney Act. According to Nylon, the EP is a "meditation on gender and the artifice that comes along with social constructions".

Composition
According to Queerty Timothy Allen, the title track "tells the story of how the traditionally separate colors of gender and sexuality are blurring into a kaleidoscope of possibilities".

Promotion
The music video for "Kaleidoscope" sees Courtney Act in drag, meeting and kissing a girl. The song served as the official theme of the Sydney Gay and Lesbian Mardi Gras in 2016.

Track listing
 "Kaleidoscope" – 3:23
 "Ecstasy" – 4:08
 "Ugly" – 3:33
 "Body Parts" – 3:38
 "Like Me" – 3:22
 "Inhale" – 3:14

References

2015 EPs
2015 debut EPs
EPs by Australian artists
LGBT-related albums